The Belgian railway line 36 is a railway line in Belgium connecting Brussels to Liège. Completed in 1866, the line runs 99.3 km. Trains running between Brussels and Aachen in Germany use the line as far as Liège, and then line 37 between Liège and the German border, the last stop in Belgium being Welkenraedt.

Between Schaarbeek and Leuven, the line is 4-track; the outer tracks serve local trains with many stops, while the central tracks carry intercity and high-speed trains; these are called L36N, and branch off after Leuven onto a separate route that mostly follows the E5 motorway towards Liege. The Diabolo project connects L36 to the station under Brussels Airport.

The following stations are located on the line:
 
 
 
 Diegem
 Zaventem
 
 Kortenberg
 Erps-Kwerps
 Veltem
 Herent
 
 Vertrijk
 Tienen
 Ezemaal
 Neerwinden
 Landen
 Waremme
 Bleret
 Remicourt
 Momalle
 Fexhe-le-Haut-Clocher
 Voroux-Goreux
 Bierset-Awans

Inclined Planes of Liège
Between Ans and Liège the railway line has to descend 358 feet within less than 5 miles. This steep incline was initially negotiated with the help of a fixed engine driving an endless rope that was used to haul the trains without the help of a locomotive. After the late 1860s, special banking locomotives were used and the fixed engine was discarded. Another line (line 36A) was built to bypass the incline but this line is only used by freight trains.

When line 36 was electrified in 1955, most of the trains still needed a banking engine. Currently, some trains are powerful enough to climb the incline without a helper and the rest are provided with two locomotives. The rear engine is no longer removed at Ans in order to save time.

References

36
36
City of Brussels
Leuven
Liège
Standard gauge railways in Belgium
Railway lines opened in 1837